Dick Anthony (born December 8, 1932; died December 20, 2019 ) was an American musician who composed, conducted, produced, sang and performed sacred music.

Background and personal life 

Anthony was born in Waukegan, Illinois, the second of five sons of Joseph and Ruth Anthony.  He was born into a Baptist family which was very involved with religious music. His aunt was the organist for the Waukegan church his family attended and both of his parents were members of the church choir. He began studying music at age seven; his parents hoped he would be able to play for church services. He graduated in 1949 from Waukegan Township High School, attended Bethel College, St. Paul, Minnesota, and majored in vocal performance at American Conservatory of Music, Chicago. Anthony served in the U.S. Navy as a chaplain's assistant.  He was assigned to the aircraft carrier USS Forrestal; during his time on the carrier, Anthony organized and led a large choral group. Anthony, a baritone, is also a pianist and organist.

Anthony married Dorothy Bartlett, a harpist and educator in 1954. Dick and Dorothy had three children, Karyn, Scott and Cheryl.

Career

Radio and television

Anthony worked as a radio presenter with Jack Wyrtzen's "Word of Life" radio broadcasts and "Songtime" weekly show on the ABC television network from New York City. Anthony did not begin singing professionally until he became the arranger for the quartet who performed on the Word of Life. He joined the staff of Chicago radio station WMBI in 1952, performing about 25 broadcasts each week. He worked with gospel songwriter John W. Peterson on a daily radio program called "Cheer Up. Anthony also appeared on "The Songsters" and "Keep Praising" at WMBI. Anthony frequently performed duets with singer Bill Pearce on broadcasts, recordings and live concerts. Anthony and Pearce met when both worked at WMBI Radio; Pearce was also a member of WMBI's "The Melody Four" quartet. Both Anthony and Pearce also performed as members of "16 Singing Men".

In 1963 Anthony left WMBI and moved his family to Long Beach, California to direct music at the First Baptist Church of Lakewood. There they expanded the music program from a single choir to ten choirs involving 500 singers and musicians. Anthony left Long Beach in 1967 for an opportunity to work with the newly established television department of "Radio Bible Class". Anthony became the executive producer and musical director for the "Day of Discovery", a nationally syndicated television series, and for the "Radio Bible Class" ministry with Richard DeHaan. The telecasts originated first from St. Petersburg, Florida and later from Winter Haven, Florida.  The radio broadcasts came from Grand Rapids, Michigan. In 1983 Anthony produced a television series called " Praise Song" for the Southern Baptist Radio and TV Commission.   It consisted of various musicians (including 16 Singing Men, Bruce McCoy and Kim Boyce) performing Christian songs in unusual settings. It was broadcast on the ACTS TV network.

Composing, producing, arranging and conducting
Anthony was arranger, accompanist and orchestral conductor for other musicians and for several albums with "The Melody Four" quartet. He organized, arranged and conducted about a dozen albums with "16 Singing Men" for Word Records and Zondervan Records.  In all, in recording studios in Chicago, Hollywood and London, he produced more than 100 Christian music albums.   Anthony published more than 30 collections of original compositions and arrangements for various vocal and instrumental groups, including four cantatas and a youth musical.

Anthony received many offers to work with non-religious music, but was not interested as he preferred to work solely with religious music.  He had no bias against secular music and often arranged and composed his religious music with an ear toward popular music as he saw it as a way to reach people. In 1965, he opened Anthony Publishing Company/Anthony Music in Long Beach, which published both religious music and books about it.

Performing
Anthony performed in concert, first with Bill Pearce, "The Melody Four" and "16 Singing Men", and, in later years, with his wife and family. He performed internationally with Lareau Lindquist and the mission organization "Barnabas International", including at Carnegie Hall and Chicago's Orchestra Hall. At Royal Albert Hall he was guest soloist and conductor of a 1000 voice choir. Anthony also performed regularly on a Sunday music program of BBC Radio. He has also performed in remote locations in South America and Africa.  From 1985-95, he was artist-in-residence at Northwestern College in St. Paul Minnesota, performing daily radio programs on the college's 10 radio stations as well as lecturing and tutoring on musical composition, arranging and piano improvisation. During the summers of 1987-93 Anthony directed music sessions and conducted evening concerts for the Maranatha Bible and Missionary Conference in Muskegon, Michigan.

Retirement and recognition
In 1995 Anthony retired to Fort Worth, Texas where he served for 14 years as organist at Birchman Baptist Church. In 2015, Anthony was recognized for his years of work with Moody Radio with a Media Award from the National Religious Broadcasters.

Discography 

 Dick Anthony & Bill Pearce - Sword SS-2428 - 1954
 Dick Anthony & Bill Pearce -In the Garden - Singtime 1001 -1954
 Bill Pearce & Dick Anthony - Moments of Melody - Bibletone BL-0500 - 1955
 Bill Pearce & Dick Anthony - Moments of Melody - Bibletone BL-5002 - 1957
 Dick Anthony & Bill Pearce - Word Records W-3012 - 1957
 Dick Anthony - My Song - Word WST-8009 - 1959
 Dick Anthony - No Greater Love - Bibletone BL-8009 - 1959
 Sixteen Sing Men - Songs That Touch The Heart - Zondervan ZLP-0534  -  1959
 Bill Pearce & Dick Anthony - Over The Sunset Mountains - Word WST-8004  - 1959
 Bill Pearce & Dick Anthony - Pinnacle of Praise - Word WST8015  - 1959
 Bill Pearce & Dick Anthony - Rest of the Way - Word Records - WST-8409 - 1959
 Dick Anthony/Jerry Barns - Hymnbook Vol.1 - Word ALS-2007 - 1960
 Dick Anthony Choristers - Reflections - Word W-3089 - 1960
 Sixteen Sing Men - Wonderful Peace Vol. 3 - Zondervan ZLP-0575 - 1960
 Sixteen Sing Men - Wonderful Peace Vol. 3 - SESAC R-2104 - 1960
 Bill Pearce & Dick Anthony - Hymnbook Vol.1 - Word ALS-201 - 1960
 Dick Anthony Choristers - Solitude -Word WST-8060 - 1961
 Sixteen Sing Men - Over The Sunset Mountains - SESAC R-2102 - 1962
 Bill Pearce & Dick Anthony - Bill And Dick - Word Records WST-8105 - 1962
 Sixteen Sing Men - Rock of Ages Cleft For Even Me - Zondervan ZLP-0614  -  1963
 Dick Anthony - Keyboard Musings - Zondervan ZLP-0622 - 1963
 Dick Anthony - Light Out of Darkness - Hosanna L-201
 Dick Anthony - Sacred Symphony of London - Zondervan ZLP-0617  -  1963
 Talley, Joe and Marion - Handfuls of Music - Word WST-8128  -  1963
 Talley, Joe and Marion - In The Spotlight - Word WST-8037  -  1963

 Jeanette York - Songs From My Heart - Zondervan ZLP-0562 - 1963
 Sixteen Sing Men - 16 Singing Men - Vol. 6 - Zondervan ZLP-0646 - 1964
 Men of Music - Radio Bible Class - Singcord ZLP-0863 - 1964
 Dick Anthony - To Tell The Untold - Hosanna L-202 -  1965
 Dick Anthony - Horizons in Harmony - Word WST-8372 - 1966
 Dick Anthony Singing Men - Dick Anthony's Singing Men - Word WST-8335 - 1966
 Dick Anthony Singing Men - God of Our Fathers - Word WST-8705 - 1966
 Dick Anthony Singing Men - Dick Anthony's Singing Men - Word WST-8335 - 1966
 Aunt Theresa - Old Testament Heroes - Word W-3229  -  1966
 Dick Anthony Singing Men - Just A Little While - SWORD SS-2419 - 1966
 Dick Anthony - Let Your Light So Shine - Word WST-8390 - 1967
 Sixteen Sing Men - 16 Singing Men - Vol. 7 - Zondervan ZLP-0666  -  1967
 Dick Anthony Singing Men - The Old Rugged Cross - Word WST-8399  - 1967
 Sixteen Sing Men - A Better Man - Good Life GLP-312 - 1968
 Men of Music - Men of Music - Vol. 1 - Word WST-8573 - 1969
 Men of Music - Men of Music - Vol. 2 - Word WST-8512 - 1969
 Bill Pearce & Dick Anthony - The Best of Pearce and Anthony - Word WST-8587  -  1972
 Ray Felton & Clair Hess Sing Duets - I Want You To Know - Singcord ZLP-0837  -  1972
 Bill Pearce & Dick Anthony - The Best of Pearce and Anthony - Word WST-8587  -  1972
 Dick Anthony Family - More Out of Life - Angellus WR-5099  -  1975
 Dick Anthony - Sweet, Sweet Spirit - Rainbow LPS-5034 - 1977
 Dick Anthony & Bill O'Brien - Harvest Tempo R-7189 - 1977
 Sixteen Sing Men - Carols of Christmas - Zondervan ZLP-0575 - 1972
 Dick Anthony Family - Dick Anthony Family - Rainbow R-2436 - 1984
 Dick Anthony Family - Instruments of Praise - Rainbow R-2651 - 1987

Notes

References 

 Hammond Times - Vol.31, Number 6, 1969 - "Day of Discovery"
 Ludington Daily News (1982) - "Music Director, Dick Anthony - Day of Discovery"

External links
Dick Anthony at Discogs

1932 births
American gospel singers
People from Waukegan, Illinois
United States military musicians
Singers from Illinois
American male organists
Living people
21st-century organists
21st-century American male musicians
American organists